Daniellia is a genus of plants in the family Fabaceae, named after William Freeman Daniell.

It contains the following species:
Daniellia alsteeniana 
Daniellia glandulosa 
Daniellia klainei 
Daniellia oblonga 
Daniellia ogea 
Daniellia oliveri 
Daniellia pilosa 
Daniellia pynaertii 
Daniellia soyauxii 
Daniellia thurifera

References 

Detarioideae
Fabaceae genera
Taxonomy articles created by Polbot